The Song of Songs is a book of the Hebrew Bible or Old Testament.

Song of Songs may also refer to:

Films
 The Song of Songs (1918 film), based on Edward Sheldon's 1914 play
 The Song of Songs (1922 film), a German silent film
 The Song of Songs (1933 film), partially based on the Sheldon play, starring Marlene Dietrich and Brian Aherne
 Song of Songs (2005 film), starring Natalie Press and Joel Chalfen, directed by Josh Appignanesi
 Song of Songs (2015 film)

Literature
 The Song of Songs (novel), 1908, by Hermann Sudermann
 "The Song of Songs", a poem by Wilfred Owen
 "The Song of Songs", a story in the 1930 P. G. Wodehouse collection Very Good, Jeeves

Music
 Song of Songs, a cantata by Lukas Foss, 1946
 Song of Songs, a 1977 album by David and the Giants
 Song of Songs (album), 1972, by Woody Shaw
 Shir Hashirim (album), a 2013 album by composer John Zorn

Plays
 Song of Songs (Giraudoux), a 1938 play
 The Song of Songs (play), a 1914 play by Edward Sheldon based on Hermann Sudermann's novel
 The Song of Songs (Giesmių giesmė), a play directed by Eimuntas Nekrošius in 2005

Other
 Song of Songs (Egon Tschirch), a 1920s picture cycle